20th U-boat Flotilla ("20. Unterseebootsflottille") was a training flotilla ("Ausbildungsflottille ") of Nazi Germany's Kriegsmarine during World War II.

The flotilla was formed in Pillau, in June 1943 under the command of Korvettenkapitän Ernst Mengersen, and specialised in tactical training (Vortaktische Ausbildung). It was disbanded in February 1945.

References 

20
Military units and formations established in 1943
Military units and formations disestablished in 1945